Dmytro Tishyn (born 1988) is a Ukrainian chess player who holds the title of International Master (IM) (2000).

Biography
Dmytro Tishyn is student of Odessa chess school. He played for Ukraine in European Youth Chess Championships and World Youth Chess Championships in the different age groups and best result reached in 1998 in Mureck, when he won European Youth Chess Championship in the U10 age group. About this success he became FIDE Master (FM) title. Dmytro Tishyn two times has participated in Ukrainian Chess Championship final's (2002, 2003). He three times has participated in the Ukrainian Team Chess Championship with various chess clubs (2002, 2006, 2009). In 2003, Dmytro Tishyn won national chess tournament in Illichivsk.

In 2000, he awarded the FIDE International Master (IM) title. Since 2009, Dmytro Tishyn rarely participate in chess tournaments.

References

External links

Dmytro Tishyn chess games at 365chess.com

1988 births
Living people
Ukrainian chess players
Chess International Masters